The AFF U-19 Youth Championship is an annual international football competition contested by the national teams of the members of the ASEAN Football Federation (AFF) and occasionally invited nations from the rest of Asia.  The tournament was previously played at under-20 level (except in 2003 it was held a special under-18 competition), however the AFF followed the lead of the Asian Football Confederation after they renamed its U-20 competition to fall in line with FIFA's naming conventions and also to reflect the age of the players at the competition.  Thailand were the champions in the first ever edition in 2002.

Summary

Performance by country

Participating nations 

Legend

  — Champions
  — Runners-up
  — Third place
  — Fourth place

 GS — Group stage
 q — Qualified for the current tournament
  — Did not enter / Withdrew / Banned
  — Hosts

Awards

Top scorers

All-time ranking table

See also 
 AFF U-16 Championship
 AFC U-20 Asian Cup
 ASEAN Football Championship

References

External links 
 AFF U19 Youth Championship at ASEAN Football Federation official website

 
Under-19 association football competitions
AFF competitions
Recurring sporting events established in 2002
2002 establishments in Southeast Asia
Annual sporting events